"Barack Obama vs. Mitt Romney" is a song and music video, performed by Iman "Alphacat" Crosson, Peter "Nice Peter" Shukoff, and Lloyd "EpicLLOYD" Ahlquist.  It is the 8th episode of the 2nd season of the YouTube video series Epic Rap Battles of History. The video was released on October 15, 2012 on the show's YouTube channel in anticipation of the 2012 US presidential election.

Music video
The video features President of the United States Barack Obama (portrayed by Iman Crosson) and former Governor of Massachusetts Mitt Romney (portrayed by Lloyd Ahlquist) facing off in a rap battle. Following four back-and-forth verses, former President Abraham Lincoln (portrayed by Peter Shukoff) interrupts the two and begins rapping against both Obama and Romney (Lincoln had previously appeared in the first season of the series, battling Chuck Norris) Lincoln proceeds to "bitch smack" the two before being carried away by an American bald eagle.

As of November 2022, the video has received over 158 million views on YouTube.

Legacy
Two spiritual sequels to the battle, "Donald Trump vs Hillary Clinton" and "Donald Trump vs Joe Biden" were made in correspondence with the 2016 and 2020 presidential elections. Abraham Lincoln returns in the former as a third party rapper, only "bitch smacking" Trump, though he does make Clinton flinch. This was allegedly done as Peter and Lloyd thought it would not be in Lincoln's nature to hit a woman. Following criticism that the battle was tipped in favor of Clinton as support for her in the election (as her criticism by Lincoln was less harsh than that directed at Trump), "Donald Trump vs Joe Biden" did not feature a third-party rapper.

Reception
The video was one of the most popular viral videos of 2012 and was discussed in a New York Times article.

Awards and nominations
The video was nominated for "Video of the Year" at the 2013 YouTube Music Awards.

Certifications
In July 2013, the song was certified Gold by the RIAA, making ERB the first YouTube channel to do so.

References

External links
Original ERB music video on YouTube

2012 songs
2012 United States presidential election in popular culture
2012 YouTube videos
Cultural depictions of Abraham Lincoln
Epic Rap Battles of History
Maker Studios videos
Mitt Romney
Music videos
Parodies
Romney, Mitt